Helsington is a civil parish in the South Lakeland district of the English county of Cumbria.  It includes the village of Brigsteer and Sizergh Castle and Garden, a property owned by the National Trust. In the 2001 census the parish had a population of 288, increasing at the 2011 census to 308.

Significant Roman artefacts have been discovered in the north of the parish close to the ruined fort at Watercrook, Alavana.

See also

Listed buildings in Helsington

References

External links
 Cumbria County History Trust: Helsington (nb: provisional research only – see Talk page)

External links
 Helsington Parish Council

Civil parishes in Cumbria